Nevil O’Neill, (1923–1992) was Dean of Clogher from 1986 until 1989.

He was educated at Trinity College, Dublin and ordained in 1947. After curacies in Enniskillen and Trory he held incumbencies at Galloon, Drummully  and Clogher  until his time as Dean.

References

20th-century Irish Anglican priests
1923 births
Alumni of Trinity College Dublin
Deans of Clogher
1992 deaths